Gabriella Ferrari Peirano (born March 14, 1991) is a Venezuelan  beauty pageant titleholder. At the Miss Venezuela 2011 pageant she placed 2nd to Irene Esser, earning the title Miss Venezuela Mundo. 

Ferrari also represented Venezuela in the Reinado Internacional del Café 2012, in Manizales, Colombia, on January 8, 2012, and won the title of 2nd runner up.

References

External links
Miss Venezuela Official Website
Miss Venezuela La Nueva Era MB

1991 births
Living people
Venezuelan female models
Venezuelan people of Italian descent
Venezuelan people of Portuguese descent
People from Valencia, Venezuela
Miss World 2012 delegates